David Pate (born April 16, 1962) is a former professional tennis player from the United States who won two singles titles and eighteen doubles titles during his career. He reached a career-high singles ranking of World No. 18 in June 1987 and attained the World No. 1 doubles ranking in January 1991. His greatest success came in 1991 when he won the Australian Open doubles title together with compatriot Scott Davis  and reached the doubles final at the US Open later that year.  Before turning professional, Pate played college tennis at Texas Christian University (TCU) in Fort Worth, Texas, where he was a six time All-American playing for the Horned Frogs.

Career finals

Singles (2 wins – 4 losses)

Doubles (18 wins – 18 losses)

Doubles performance timeline

External links
 
 
 

Living people
1962 births
American male tennis players
Australian Open (tennis) champions
Sportspeople from the Las Vegas Valley
TCU Horned Frogs men's tennis players
Tennis players from Los Angeles
Tennis people from Nevada
Grand Slam (tennis) champions in men's doubles
ATP number 1 ranked doubles tennis players